Peter Gandy may refer to:

 Peter Gandy (author), British author who focuses on mysticism
 Peter Gandy (athlete) (born 1961), former Australian sprinter